Yin Hongbo (born 30 October 1989) is a Chinese footballer who currently plays for Meizhou Hakka in the Chinese Super League.

Club career
Yin Hongbo started his football career with China League Two side Guangdong Sunray Cave in 2007. He played an integral role as the club won promotion to the second tier during the 2008 season. He was given the club's captaincy during the 2011 season after Li Zhihai was suspended by the club. In January 2013, Yin moved to China League One club Henan Jianye on a free transfer. He would go on to be part of the squad that won the division and promotion into the top tier at the end of the 2013 China League One campaign.

On 24 January 2017, Yin transferred to fellow Chinese Super League side Hebei China Fortune. He made his debut on 11 March 2017 in a 1-1 draw against Chongqing Lifan. He scored his first goal for the club on 8 April 2017 in a 4-2 win against Shanghai Shenhua. 

After five seasons with the Hebei, on 11 April 2022 he joined newly promoted top tier club Meizhou Hakka. He would go on to make his debut in a league game on 13 June 2022 against Shenzhen in a 2-1 victory. This would be followed by his first goal for the club, which was in a league game on 29 June 2022 against Cangzhou Mighty Lions in a 4-1 victory.

International career
Yin made his debut for Chinese national team on 10 January 2017 in a 2-0 loss against Iceland in the 2017 China Cup. He scored his first goal for China and assisted three times on 7 June 2017 in an 8-1 win against the Philippines.

Career statistics

Club statistics
.

International statistics

International goals

Scores and results list China's goal tally first.

Honours

Club
Henan Jianye
China League One: 2013

Personal life
Yin received a bachelor's degree at South China Normal University in the summer of 2015.

References

External links
Player profile at Sodasoccer.com 
 

1989 births
Living people
Chinese footballers
Footballers from Changchun
Guangdong Sunray Cave players
Henan Songshan Longmen F.C. players
Hebei F.C. players
Chinese Super League players
China League One players
China League Two players
Association football midfielders
China international footballers